= Treppenhauer =

Mountain in Germany

Coordinates: 50°56′N 13°02′E

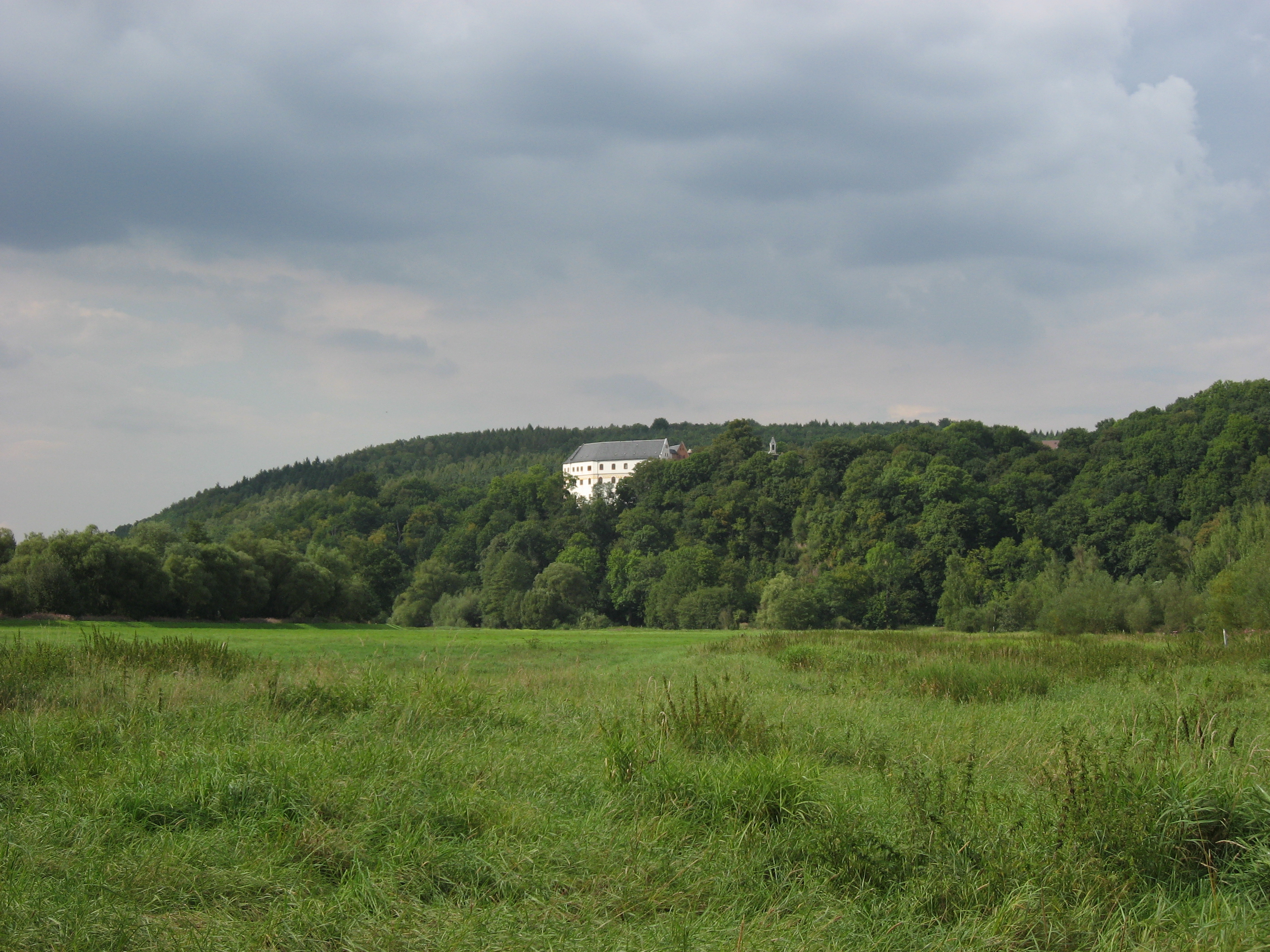
- Treppenhauer.

Highest point
- Elevation: 351 m (1,152 ft)

Geography
- Location: Saxony, Germany

Treppenhauer is a mountain of Saxony, southeastern Germany.
